Naginayani Cheruvu Thanda is a village in the Anantapur district of Andhra Pradesh, India. It lies 3 km from the small town of Somandepalle and 13 km from the town of Penukonda. Nestled between surrounding hills, this village has traditionally housed a farming and herding community.

References 

Villages in Anantapur district